Patricia Lucía Carreño Martínez (born January 1, 1990) is a Venezuelan model, social communicator and beauty pageant titleholder who was titled as Miss Supranational Venezuela 2014. Carreño had the right to represent Venezuela in the Miss Supranational 2014 competition.

Life and career

Early life
Carreño was born in Cabimas, Zulia. From very early on, she worked as a professional model. In addition, she obtained a bachelor's degree in Social Communication from the University of Zulia, which she works as a producer.

Pageantry
In 2009, Carreño began participating in beauty pageants. His first experience was presented when she was part of the Reinado de la Feria de la Chinita in Maracaibo. 

She was also part of the Sambil Model Maracaibo 2010 contest. On that occasion, Carreño obtained the Miss Elegance band. In addition, Patricia was Reina del Deporte de la Feria del Lago 2012.

Miss Venezuela 2013 
Patricia was part of the reality show, Miss Venezuela, Todo por la corona produced by Sony Latin America in conjunction with Venevisión.

Miss Supranational Venezuela 2014 
After her attempt to be part of Miss Venezuela. Carreño is chosen as Miss Supranational Venezuela, a fact that gave her the opportunity to represent Venezuela in the international contest, Miss Supranational.

At the same time, Venezuela would send Yenniffer Poleo to another version of the Miss Supranational contest, in this case based in India. This situation occurred with several other nations.

Miss Supranational 2014 
Patricia represented Venezuela in the Miss Supranational 2014 pageant, an event that was finally held on December 5, 2014 at the Municipal Sports and Recreation Center MOSIR, in Krynica-Zdrój, Poland. Patricia could not qualify in the semifinalists group.

References

External links
 

1990 births
Living people
Miss Venezuela winners
People from Cabimas
Venezuelan female models